A number of American ships have been named Harvard, including:

Merchant ships
 , a bulk carrier built in 1900 for the Pittsburgh Steamship Company 
 , a coastal passenger ship, which also served as troopship USS Charles 
 , a steam trawler, later converted to the fishery research vessel Albatross III
 , a diesel trawler, which also as served as the Q-ship USS Captor

and also
 , a VC2-S-AP1 standard Victory Ship, built in 1945.   Launched as the first of a new series of U.S. Maritime Commission ships named after U.S. educational institutions, The Harvard Corporation later voted to give the ship a library of about 140 volumes selected by the American Merchant Marine Library Association. 
 , a EC2-S-C1 standard Liberty Ship built in 1942.

Naval ships
 , an auxiliary cruiser purchased for use in the Spanish–American War and in commission during 1898
 USS Harvard (ID-1298), a troop transport acquired in April 1918 that was renamed  two days after commissioning, then was again renamed USS Harvard in July 1920 before being sold in October 1920
 , a leased yacht in commission as a patrol boat from 1917 to 1919

References

 

Ship names